Capital punishment was a legal penalty in Zambia until 2022. Despite its former legality, the country's last execution was in 1997. Zambia was considered "Abolitionist in Practice". 

There were at least 9 new death sentences in Zambia in 2021. 257 people were on death row at the end of 2021.

On 25 May 2022, Zambian President Hakainde Hichilema announced that the death penalty would soon be abolished in Zambia.

On 23 December 2022, capital punishment was officially abolished.

References

Zambia
Law of Zambia